Isobel Batt-Doyle (born 14 September 1995) is an Australian Olympic athlete.

Early years
Batt-Doyle came from a family of runners. Her parents ran marathons, trail races and ultra running. When she was 8-years-old she started little athletics. A year later she ran in the Adelaide City Bay Fun Run. She ran the six kilometres holding her step dad's hand. Batt-Doyle regularly made the state team for cross country and then began track events when still an early teen.

After graduating from Seymour College in Adelaide, Batt-Doyle accepted a US college scholarship for running and went to St. John's University in New York. She transferred to University of Washington in Seattle for her second year. In 2016 and 2017, she decided to run longer distances and competed in 5000m and 10000m events.

Achievements
Batt-Doyle made her debut for Australia at the 2017 World University Games in the 10,000m.

In 2019, she was the NCAA outdoor 10,000m bronze medalist and made the All-America First Team. She also made the All-America Second Team in the 5000m indoors.

In 2020, her boyfriend Riley Cocks took over her coaching. She ran significant personal bests over 3000m and 5000m. The highlight was coming second in the 10,000m at Zatopek in 31:43.26. It was a 37 seconds PB and elevated her from 21st to 10th on the Australian all-time list. (Zatopek is named after Emil Zatopek, the Czech long-distance runner, it is the most prestigious track race in Australia).

In January 2021, she finished second behind Rose Davies at the Australian 10,000m Championships in Melbourne. In May that year, she and Davies secured places in the 5000m at the delayed 2020 Tokyo Olympics as Batt-Doyle won in Nijmegen in a personal best time of 15 minutes 04.10 beating Uganda's Esther Chebet into second with Davies fourth. In the event's heat of the Tokyo Games, Batt-Doyle ran a time of 15:21.65 coming 15th and was therefore eliminated.

On 31 December 2022, she set a world female parkrun best mark of 15:25 at the Aldinga Beach event in Adelaide.

On 5 February 2023, Batt-Doyle ran 1:09.27 at the Marugame half marathon in Japan, a new personal best for the distance.

Personal bests
 5000 metres – 15:04.10 (Nijmegen 2021)
 10,000 metres – 31:40.10 (London 2022)
Road
 5 kilometres – 15:57 (Noosa 2021)
 10 kilometres – 32:10 (Launceston 2020)
 Half-marathon - 1:09.27 (Marugame 2023)
 Marathon – 2:27:54 (Nagoya 2023)
 Parkrun – 15:25 (Adelaide 2022) World best

References

1995 births
Living people
Australian female long-distance runners
Competitors at the 2017 Summer Universiade
Competitors at the 2019 Summer Universiade
Athletes (track and field) at the 2020 Summer Olympics
Olympic athletes of Australia
St. John's Red Storm athletes
Washington Huskies women's track and field athletes
Athletes (track and field) at the 2022 Commonwealth Games
21st-century Australian women